"You Didn't Expect That'" is a 2-step garage song recorded by Filipino-American singer Billy Crawford, taken from the album Ride. The song was a moderate success, reaching the top 40 in France, Belgium, Switzerland and the UK, peaking at numbers 6, 13, 23 and 35, respectively. The song is his second highest-charting single in the UK, after "Trackin'" which reached No. 32 on the UK Singles Chart.

Track listing
UK CD maxi-single
"You Didn't Expect That" (Edit) – 3:01
"You Didn't Expect That" (Jaimeson Remix) – 6:03
"You Didn't Expect That" (Double R Remix) – 3:47
"You Didn't Expect That" (Almighty Remix) – 6:18

References 

2001 songs
2002 singles
2003 singles
Billy Crawford songs
UK garage songs
Songs written by Steve Robson
Songs written by Wayne Hector
Song recordings produced by Steve Robson
V2 Records singles